The 2016–17 Khuzestan Premier League season was the 17th season of the Khuzestan Premier League which took place from September 15, 2016 to March 17, 2017 with 14 teams competing from the province of Khuzestan. Teams played home and away with one another each playing 26 matches. Esteghlal Ramshir finished the season on top of the standings and was promoted to division 3 of the Iranian football system. Meanwhile, finishing in last place, Jam Abadan will be relegated to the Khuzestan Division 1 league. Following negotiations between the Khuzestan Football Association and the Iranian football federation, the division 3 quota for Khuzestan was increased by 1 allowing Sepahan Izeh, the runners-up of this year's league to also get promoted to division 3.

Teams

Final standings

Results

See also 

 2016–17 Azadegan League
 2016–17 League 2
 2016–17 League 3
 2016–17 Hazfi Cup
 2016 Iranian Super Cup

References 

1
Iran
Khuzestan Premier League